Oomberg Airport  was a small public use airport located near Zottegem, East Flanders, Belgium. The airport is not in use anymore.

See also
List of airports in Belgium

References 

Defunct airports in Belgium